Zoref is a Jewish surname. It was originally given to goldsmiths, derived from the Hebrew . Notable people with the surname include:

Joshua Heschel Zoref (1633–1700), Lithuanian ascetic and figure in the Sabbatean movement
Shlomo Zalman Zoref (1786–1851), Lithuanian rabbi

References

Jewish surnames
Occupational surnames